The President's Medal for Shooting was a medal awarded in the Republic of Rhodesia to the Champion shot of the Rhodesian Security Forces.

History 

A total of 8 medals were won by personnel of the Rhodesian Security Forces, including Inspector D. Toddun, Station Sergeant G. James, and Field Reservist W. Tarr who was awarded a bar for a subsequent award.

The official abbreviation of the medal was Pres MS, which was also its postnominal letters.

Description 

A silver, 36mm circular medal, the obverse of the medal depicts a kneeling pioneer rifleman, with the words "The President's Medal".  The obverse of the medal depicts .303 and FN rifles crossed over each other and a pioneer-era bandolier, encircled with the words "Champion Shot in the Rhodesian Security Forces". The ribbon also is given a clasp denoting the year the medal was awarded. A silver clasp was also awarded for subsequent awards.

The ribbon consists of three equal vertical stripes of maroon, green, and blue.

See also 

Orders, decorations, and medals of Rhodesia
Orders, decorations, and medals of Zimbabwe

References 

Orders, decorations, and medals of Rhodesia
Rhodesia